Tamara Margaret "Tamie" Fraser  (née Beggs; born 28 February 1936) is the widow of Malcolm Fraser, who held office as Prime Minister of Australia between 1975 and 1983.

Early life
Tamara Margaret Beggs was born in Adelaide, South Australia, the eldest of four children born to Helen Karen (née Seeck) and Sandford Robert Beggs. Her mother was a state champion in golf. Her father came from a family of pastoralists, and was a grandson of Francis Beggs, who was born in Malahide, Ireland, and arrived in the Port Phillip District in 1849. Her maternal grandfather, John Alexander Seeck, was a Baltic German born in what is now Latvia. He arrived in Australia in 1883 and became a pioneer of the local wine industry.

Beggs grew up on Nareeb Nareeb, her father's property near Glenthompson, Victoria. She began her education with governesses, and then at the age of nine was sent to board at The Hermitage, a girls' school in Geelong that was later merged into Geelong Grammar School. She was a school prefect and sport captain.

Marriage and children

Fraser met her future husband at a New Year's Eve party in 1955; she was almost six years younger than he. They announced their engagement in May 1956 and married in Willaura on 9 December. The couple had four children together: Mark (b. 1958), Angela (b. 1959), Hugh (b. 1963), and Phoebe (b. 1966).

Public life
Fraser disliked public speaking and electioneering work, but when her husband fell ill during the crucial election campaign of December 1975, after the dismissal of the Whitlam government, she represented him and spoke on his behalf.

Fraser founded and was president of The Australiana Fund from 1978 to 1983. She is President of Australia's Open Garden Scheme. In 2004 she was appointed an Officer of the Order of Australia for her service to the community through fostering the recognition and preservation of Australian artistic achievement, for initiating and promoting a range of activities to support people with disabilities, and for support of charitable, health and service groups.

See also
Spouse of the Prime Minister of Australia

References

External links

Living people
1936 births
Australian Anglicans
Malcolm Fraser
Officers of the Order of Australia
People from Victoria (Australia)
Spouses of prime ministers of Australia
People educated at Geelong Grammar School
Australian people of German descent
Australian people of Irish descent
Australian people of Russian descent
People of Baltic German descent